Halle Münsterland is a 7,000-capacity convention center located in Münster, Germany. It has held concerts from well-known artists such as The Rolling Stones, Jethro Tull,  Joan Baez, Pet Shop Boys, U2, Andrea Berg, Leonard Cohen, The Who (in 1970) and Chris De Burgh.

References

Buildings and structures in Münster
Culture in Münster
Music venues in Germany
Convention centres in Germany
Tourist attractions in North Rhine-Westphalia
Volleyball venues in Germany